This is a list of seasons completed by the New York Jets. The Jets, formerly known as the Titans of New York, are an American football franchise that competes as a member club in the National Football League (NFL). The list documents the season-by-season records of the Jets' franchise from 1960 to the present, including postseason records and league awards for individual players or head coaches. The Titans were a part of the inaugural season of the American Football League (AFL) in 1960. In 1963, the Titans changed their name to the Jets after a change in ownership.

The New York Jets have won one National Football League championship in Super Bowl III. In their 60-season history, they have an overall regular season record of 408 wins, 500 losses, and 8 ties. They have made 14 postseason appearances, and have an overall postseason record of 12 wins and 13 losses.

Seasons

Note: Statistics are correct through the end of the 2022 NFL season.

Footnotes

See also
Pro-Football-Reference.com NYJ Profile
Team Records

 
New York Jets
seasons